Sixto Arturo Casabona Martínez (8 January 1962 – 10 October 2004), commonly known as Sixto, was a Spanish footballer who played as a forward.

Career
Born in Benagéber, Valencia, Sixto began his career with Valencia's B team, Mestalla. On 9 September 1984, Sixto made his debut for Valencia, scoring a penalty in a 5–1 win against Espanyol. During his three seasons in Valencia's first team, Sixto scored 18 times, including a hat-trick against Celta Vigo on 8 September 1985, in 53 league games. In 1987, Sixto signed for Elche, winning promotion to La Liga in his first season with the club, scoring 20 goals in 34 appearances. The following season, Sixto made 20 appearances, scoring once. After a groin injury prevented more game time, Sixto terminated his contract with Elche at the end of the season, signing for Palamós. Sixto remained with Palamós for two seasons, signing for Cartagena in 1991, before his retirement a year later.

References

1962 births
2004 deaths
Sportspeople from the Province of Valencia
Association football forwards
Valencia CF Mestalla footballers
Valencia CF players
Elche CF players
Palamós CF footballers
Cartagena FC players
La Liga players
Segunda División players
Segunda División B players
Spanish football managers
Spanish footballers